Next Time I'll Aim for the Heart is a 2014 French thriller film written and directed by Cédric Anger. It was adapted from the novel Un assassin au-dessus de tout soupçon by Yvan Stefanovitch. Set in 1970s Oise, France, it is based on the story of Alain Lamare, a gendarme who was later revealed to be a murderer (serial killer in the film).

Cast 
 Guillaume Canet as Franck 
 Jean-Paul Comart as Franck's father 
 Hélène Vauquois as Franck's mother 
 Ana Girardot as Sophie  
 Jean-Yves Berteloot as Lacombe
 Patrick Azam as Tonton 
 Cédric Le Maoût as Olivier 
 Alice de Lencquesaing as Melissa 
 Nicolas Ronchi as the doctor
 Nicolas Carpentier as Paul 
 Alexandre Carrière as Ossart 	
 Franck Andrieux as Auzier 
 Arthur Dujardin as Bruno 
 Pierick Tournier as Carpentier 
 Laura Giudice as Roxane

Accolades 
In January 2015, the film received two nominations at the 20th Lumières Awards. The film also received two César Award nominations at the 40th César Awards.

References

External links 
 

2014 films
2014 crime thriller films
2010s French-language films
French crime thriller films
Thriller films based on actual events
Films based on French novels
Films set in 1978
Films set in 1979
French serial killer films
2010s serial killer films
2010s French films